"Slide" is a song by American singer H.E.R. featuring American rapper YG. It was released on September 27, 2019 through RCA Records as the lead single off the former's debut studio album Back of My Mind (2021). An official remix featuring American rappers and singers Pop Smoke, A Boogie wit da Hoodie, and Chris Brown was released in January 2020.

Background
H.E.R. debuted the song "Slide" during her set at the Lights On Festival. It was released as a single on September 27, 2019.

Music video
The music video for "Slide" was premiered by Complex on October 17, 2019 before its official release the following day. It was directed by Mike Ho and filmed in different locations in California, including the Grand Lake Theatre and the West Oakland station. The video opens with a recording of H.E.R.'s performance at the Concord Pavilion for the inaugural Lights On Festival. Other scenes feature dance numbers, bikers, graffiti and ghost riding.

Commercial performance
"Slide" debuted at 85 on the Billboard Hot 100 in January 2020. It peaked at #43, becoming H.E.R.'s highest entry on the chart. It also appeared on several other Billboard charts, including the R&B/Hip-Hop Airplay in which it peaked at 17.

In New Zealand, it did not reach the Official Top 40 Singles but peaked at 23 on the Hot 40 Singles.

Live performances
H.E.R. recorded a live version of "Slide" at Vevo's New York City studios. She performed the song alongside a keyboardist, a bassist and a percussionist. It was published on December 17, 2019.

She performed "Slide" while playing the guitar during an episode of Late Night with Seth Meyers aired in January 2020. YG's verse was replaced by an instrumental intro played by H.E.R.'s drummer and bassist.

Remix

The official remix featuring Pop Smoke, A Boogie wit da Hoodie and Chris Brown instead of YG was released on January 15, 2020. It features the same base instrumental as the original version with three additional verses performed by Pop Smoke, A Boogie wit da Hoodie and Chris Brown.

The remix peaked at 32 on New Zealand's Hot 40 Singles chart.

Personnel
Credits adapted from Tidal.

 H.E.R. – associated performer, composer, lyricist
 YG – associated performer, composer, lyricist
 Cardo – producer, composer, lyricist
 Charles Carter – composer, lyricist
 Elijah Dias – composer, lyricist
 Jermaine Dupri – composer, lyricist
 Roger Parker – composer, lyricist
 Shawn Carter – composer, lyricist
 Steven Arrington – composer, lyricist
 Tiara Thomas – composer, lyricist
 Waung Hankerson – composer, lyricist
 Dave Kutch – mastering engineer
 Jaycen Joshua – mixing engineer
 Dee Brown – recording engineer
 Miki Tsutsumi – engineer
 Alex Pyle – assistant engineer
 Ayana Depas – assistant engineer
 DJ Riggins – assistant engineer
 Jacob Richards – assistant engineer
 Lou Carrao – assistant engineer
 Mike Seaberg – assistant engineer

Charts

Weekly charts

Year-end charts

Certifications

References

2019 singles
2019 songs
H.E.R. songs
RCA Records singles
Song recordings produced by Cardo (record producer)
Songs written by Cardo (record producer)
Songs written by H.E.R.
Songs written by Jay-Z
Songs written by Jermaine Dupri
Songs written by Tiara Thomas
Songs written by YG (rapper)
YG (rapper) songs
Contemporary R&B songs
Hip hop songs